The Caesar Canyon Limestone is a geologic formation in Nevada. It preserves fossils dating back to the Ordovician period.

See also

 List of fossiliferous stratigraphic units in Nevada
 Paleontology in Nevada

References
 

Ordovician geology of Nevada
Limestone formations of the United States
Ordovician System of North America
Geologic formations of Nevada
Ordovician southern paleotropical deposits